Sir Henry Rudolph Howard,  (20 April 1890 – 11 August 1970) was an Australian businessman, retailer, and the Lord Mayor of the City of Perth from 1955 to 1964.

Early life
Howard was born in Manchester, England, on 20 April 1890.

City of Light
During his time as mayor, Howard encouraged the people of Perth to switch on their lights as astronaut John Glenn passed overhead in an orbiting spacecraft so that he was able to see the city; Perth was subsequently known world-wide as the City of Light.

References

1890 births
1970 deaths
British emigrants to Australia
20th-century Australian businesspeople
20th-century Australian politicians
Australian businesspeople in retailing
Australian Knights Bachelor
Australian Knights Commander of the Order of the British Empire
Mayors and Lord Mayors of Perth, Western Australia